Serebropol is a rural locality (a selo) and the administrative center of Serebropolsky Selsoviet, Tabunsky District, Altai Krai, Russia. The population was 998 as of 2013. There are 5 streets.

Geography 
Serebropol is located 31 km northeast of Tabuny (the district's administrative centre) by road. Saratovka is the nearest rural locality.

References 

Rural localities in Tabunsky District